The Hyatt Regency Orlando is a hotel directly connected to the Orange County Convention Center located on International Drive in Orlando, Florida. The 32-story, 1641-room hotel was originally constructed in 1986 as The Peabody Orlando, a brand extension of the original Peabody Hotel in Memphis, Tennessee.

In late 2010, a $450 million renovation of the hotel added a 31-story wing that doubled the number of rooms from 891 to 1641 and added a resort pool complete with a water slide, waterfall, bridges, a kiddie area, a splash pad, an outdoor restaurant, and cabanas for rent.

On August 28, 2013, UST Hotel Joint Venture Ltd. sold The Peabody Orlando for $717 million, to Hyatt Hotels. The hotel was renamed Hyatt Regency Orlando on October 1, 2013.

Gallery

References

External links

Official website

Hotel buildings completed in 1986
Hotels in Orlando, Florida
Skyscraper hotels in Florida
Skyscrapers in Florida
Hyatt Hotels and Resorts
1986 establishments in Florida